Eclectochromis ornatus is a species of haplochromine cichlid which is endemic to Malawi. where it occurs in Lake Malawi and Lake Malombe. It is a predator of invertebrates and of smaller fishes which lives in shallow areas of the lake which have a soft or mixed substrate.

References

Fish of Malawi
ornatus
Taxa named by Charles Tate Regan
Fish described in 1922
Taxonomy articles created by Polbot
Fish of Lake Malawi